Thubana bisignatella is a moth in the family Lecithoceridae. It was described by Francis Walker in 1864. It is found on Borneo.

Adults are cupreous, the forewings with a large irregularly triangular white spot on the middle of the costa.

References

Moths described in 1864
Thubana